Lomagundi College (or simply Lomagundi) is an independent, co-educational, boarding and day, senior school in Zimbabwe which is situated about 130 km northwest of the capital Harare along the Harare-Chirundu highway on the outskirts of Chinhoyi (formerly known as Sinoia) the provincial capital of Mashonaland West.

Lomagundi College was ranked as one of the Top 10 High Schools in Zimbabwe in 2014.

Lomagundi College is a member of the Association of Trust Schools (ATS) and the Headmaster is a member of the Conference of Heads of Independent Schools in Zimbabwe (CHISZ).

History 
Lomagundi College was opened in 1983. The school was built in a valley, over an abandoned coal mine named Shengwidsee.

The senior school boarding hostels were named after areas around Zimbabwe, namely Sebakwe, Mana (the two boys hostels) with Vumba and Charara being the girls hostels.

Notable alumni

Lomagundi has produced some great sportsmen and women over the decades. 

 Greg Lamb - Cricketer
 Sean Ervine - Cricketer
 Brendan Taylor - Cricketer
 Tongayi Chirisa - Actor  
 Craig Ervine - Cricket 
 Tsungai Muswerakuenda  - Miss Universe Zimbabwe

See also

List of schools in Zimbabwe
List of boarding schools

References

External links
 
 Lomagundi College profile on the ATS website
 "Chirisa traces journey to Hollywood" in Zimbabwe Daily News
 Lomagundi College on Zimbabwe Schools Guide website
 

Chinhoyi
Co-educational schools in Zimbabwe
Private schools in Zimbabwe
Cambridge schools in Zimbabwe
High schools in Zimbabwe
Buildings and structures in Mashonaland West Province
Education in Mashonaland West Province
Educational institutions established in 1983
1983 establishments in Zimbabwe
Member schools of the Association of Trust Schools